Versa or VERSA may refer to:

Geography
 Versa (Po), a tributary of the Po that runs through Pavia, Italy
 Versa (Tanaro), a tributary of the Tanaro that runs through Asti, Italy

Transportation
 Maruti Versa, a small van
 Nissan Versa, a subcompact car
 Optare Versa, a British-built midibus

Other uses
 Fitbit Versa
 Versa (band) or VersaEmerge, an experimental rock band
 VERSA, a sub-brand for NEC's computer products

See also
 Vancomycin-resistant Staphylococcus aureus or VRSA
 Vice Versa (disambiguation)